Berezovka is a rural locality (a selo) and the administrative center of Berezovsky Rural Settlement, Borisovsky District, Belgorod Oblast, Russia. The population was 1,281 as of 2010. There are 12 streets.

Geography 
Berezovka is located 14 km southwest of Borisovka (the district's administrative centre) by road. Krasivo is the nearest rural locality.

References 

Rural localities in Borisovsky District